Clube Atlético Tricordiano, or simply Tricordiano, is a currently inactive Brazilian football team from Três Corações, Minas Gerais, founded on May 13, 2008. 

In 2016, they competed in the Campeonato Mineiro - Módulo I, however in 2017 they were relegated to Modulo II.

References

External links
Official website 
Ogol website 
Federação Mineira de Futebol website 

2008 establishments in Brazil
Association football clubs established in 2008
Football clubs in Minas Gerais